Jeff Kealty (born April 9, 1976) is an American former professional ice hockey defenseman and current Director of Player Personnel for the Nashville Predators of the National Hockey League (NHL).  He was drafted in the first round, 22nd overall, by the Quebec Nordiques in the 1994 NHL Entry Draft.  However, he never played in the National Hockey League, retiring after playing just 71 games with the Milwaukee Admirals of the International Hockey League.

After retiring from playing, Kealty became a scout for the Nashville Predators organization.  On July 25, 2007, Kealty was named the team's Chief Amateur Scout.  On December 1, 2017, Nashville Predators President of Hockey Operations/General Manager David Poile announced that Kealty had been promoted to Director of Player Personnel, and currently assists Poile on all player personnel decisions, in addition to the duties he was already responsible for as Chief Amateur Scout.

Career statistics

Regular season and playoffs

International

References

External links
 

1976 births
American men's ice hockey defensemen
Boston University Terriers men's ice hockey players
Living people
Milwaukee Admirals (IHL) players
Nashville Predators scouts
National Hockey League first-round draft picks
Sportspeople from Newton, Massachusetts
Quebec Nordiques draft picks
Ice hockey players from Massachusetts
NCAA men's ice hockey national champions
Ice hockey people from Massachusetts